Coryell may refer to:

People 
 Coryell (surname), includes a list of people with the surname
 Coryell Judie (born 1987), American football cornerback

Others 
 Coryell (album), a 1969 album of Larry Coryell
 Coryell County, Texas, U.S.

See also